Fahrudin Prljača (born 3 November 1944) is a Bosnian-Herzegovinian and Yugoslav retired footballer who played the position of striker.

Club career
He was a member of FK Sarajevo from 1961 to 1973, and again between 1974 and 1975, going on to win the club's first Yugoslav League title in 1967. He also represented Belgian side Sporting Hasselt.

International career
He made one appearance for the Yugoslavia national team in 1966 against Bulgaria.

References

External links
 

1944 births
Living people
Footballers from Sarajevo
Association football forwards
Yugoslav footballers
Yugoslavia international footballers
FK Sarajevo players
FK Leotar players
Yugoslav First League players
Belgian Third Division players
Yugoslav Second League players
Yugoslav expatriate footballers
Expatriate footballers in Belgium
Yugoslav expatriate sportspeople in Belgium